The 1995 UEFA Cup Final was played over two legs between two Italian teams Juventus and Parma. The first leg at Parma's Stadio Ennio Tardini ended in a 1–0 victory for the home team. The second leg at the San Siro in Milan finished in a 1–1 draw, and a win on aggregate for  Parma. It was their first UEFA Cup final victory, with Juventus having won three in the past.

Background
This was the fifth time a continental final had been played by two teams from the same country and the third all-Italian final. The first also featured Juventus, who overcame Fiorentina by three goals to one over two legs in the 1990 UEFA Cup Final. It was Parma's first appearance in a UEFA Cup final, but represented the third consecutive year in which they had contested a European final, following European Cup Winners' Cup final appearances in 1993 (a win) and 1994 (a defeat). It was Juventus' fourth appearance in a UEFA Cup final; the previous finals were all two-legged affairs ending in victory for the Turin club, against Athletic Bilbao in 1977 on the away goals rule, Fiorentina in 1990 and Borussia Dortmund in 1993.

Parma's only previous experience in Europe against another Italian side was in the 1993 European Super Cup when they emerged victorious over A.C. Milan by two goals to one over two legs, having lost the first leg at home by a single goal. Juventus were meanwhile attempting to complete the third leg of a treble of titles: Serie A, Coppa Italia and the UEFA Cup.

While Parma played their home tie at their home ground, Stadio Ennio Tardini, Juventus chose to play their home leg away from Turin at the San Siro, home ground of Inter Milan and Milan, because they had difficulties with the landlord at their own stadium, Stadio delle Alpi, and had experienced poor attendances there, in contrast to the big crowds they attracted playing in other cities. They had already played the semi-final of the competition in Milan (and would later play the 1996 UEFA Super Cup even further from home, in Palermo).

The two sides would also meet the following month in the 1995 Coppa Italia Final, which Juventus won 3–0 on aggregate.

Route to the final

First leg

Summary
Parma, the home team, went into a fifth-minute lead through Dino Baggio, which they held and subsequently took to the return at Milan's San Siro.

Details

Second leg

Summary
Gianluca Vialli restored parity in the tie overall before Dino Baggio struck again to give Parma a 2–1 aggregate victory. Thus provincial Parma added the UEFA Cup to the UEFA Cup Winners' Cup they had won two years before.

Details

See also
1994–95 UEFA Cup
Italian football clubs in international competitions
Juventus F.C. in European football
Parma Calcio 1913 in European football

References

External links
1994–95 season at UEFA.com
UEFA Cup 1994–95 results at RSSSF.com

2
Uefa Cup Final 1995
Uefa Cup Final 1995
Uefa Cup Final 1995
1995
Uefa Cup Final
Final
May 1995 sports events in Europe
1990s in Turin
Sports competitions in Turin